"Trouble in the Amen Corner" is a late 19th or early 20th century poem by Thomas Chalmers Harbaugh. In 1960, Archie Campbell turned a slightly modified version of the poem into a country gospel song, with spoken words. The song quotes from the hymn "Rock of Ages", which is mentioned in the original poem. Campbell's version reached #24 in the Billboard country music Top 25.

Description 
The elderly Brother Eyer habitually occupied the "amen corner", where the most vocally devout worshipers congregated, in a "fashionable church" with a "stylish congregation". But:
His voice was cracked and broken; age had touched his vocal cords.
And nearly every Sunday he would mispronounce the words
Of the hymns, and 'twas no wonder; he was old and nearly blind,
And the choir rattling onward always left him far behind.

The chorus stormed and blustered, Brother Eyer sang too slow,
And then he used the tunes in vogue a hundred years ago;
At last the storm cloud burst and the church was told, in fine,
That the brother must stop singing, or the choir would resign.
The pastor authorizes a deputation to tell him to desist. This breaks the old man's heart. The other churchgoers soon forget him, but he is now singing sweetly in another place.

Recordings 
Recordings of the song by people with Wikipedia articles include:
 1960Archie Campbell 
 1961Jim Reeves
 1966 Porter Wagoner and the Wagonmasters, on the album The Grand Ole Gospel 
 1966Wink Martindale
 1967Tex Ritter, on the album Just Beyond the Moon 
 1993Bill Anderson, on the album Country Music Heaven 
 1998Jimmy Dean, on the album Inspirational Songs 
 1999Porter Wagoner and The Blackwood Brothers, on the album The Grand Old Gospel 
 2003Porter Wagoner, on the album 22 Grand Old Gospel 2004 
 2003George Hamilton IV, on the album On a Blue Ridge Sunday 
 2006James Blackwood and the Light Crust Doughboys, on the album Keep Lookin' Up 
 2007Hank Thompson and Porter Wagoner, on the album 100 Years of Hit Recordings 
 Gordie Tapp, on the album The Good Life

References 

American poems
Gospel songs
1960 songs
Jim Reeves songs
Tex Ritter songs
Porter Wagoner songs